Donald James Mowat, CM, is a Canadian-British (naturalized American) makeup artist. He is best known for his work on 8 Mile, The Fighter, Prisoners, Skyfall,  Nightcrawler, Sicario, Nocturnal Animals, Blade Runner 2049, First Man, and Dune. Originally from Montreal, divides his time between Los Angeles and Toronto.

Donald was nominated for an Academy Award in the category Best Makeup and Hairstyling for the film Dune. He was appointed a member of the Order of Canada in 2022.

Life and career
Donald was born and raised in Montreal, Quebec, Canada to British parents. He was invited to become a member of Academy of Motion Picture Arts and Sciences in 1999. He served on the board of directors for the Actors' Fund of Canada (2008-2014) and Board member representing the Art Department Branch of the Academy of Canadian Cinema & Television (2007-2011). He is an active member of the education and membership committee member for BAFTA Los Angeles and BAFTA UK. He served twelve years as an executive makeup artists branch member at AMPAS. He is also a member of IATSE, BECTU, and the European Film Academy represented by the United Talent Agency.

Donald was awarded a Queen Elizabeth II Diamond Jubilee Medal in 2012 and the Sovereign's Medal for Volunteers by The Governor General for Canada in 2018 for his volunteer work with high school students for BAFTA LA education outreach.

Selected filmography

 8 Mile (2002)
 The Fighter (2010)
 Skyfall (2012)
 Prisoners (2013)
 Nightcrawler (2014)
 Sicario (2015)
 Nocturnal Animals (2016)

 Stronger (2017)
 Blade Runner 2049 (2017)
 First Man (2018)
 The Little Things (2021)
 Dune (2021)
 The Guilty (2021)
 Moon Knight (2022)

Awards and nominations

References

External links
 
 

1963 births
Living people
American make-up artists
British make-up artists
Canadian make-up artists
Artists from Montreal
Members of the Order of Canada
Canadian people of British descent
People with acquired American citizenship
Artists from Toronto
Artists from Los Angeles
Canadian expatriates in the United States